The Heart River is a tributary of the Missouri River, approximately   long, in western North Dakota, United States.

Course
The Heart River rises in the prairie country of Billings County, in the Little Missouri National Grassland near the south unit of Theodore Roosevelt National Park.  It flows generally eastwardly through Stark County to Gladstone, past Belfield and South Heart, through the Patterson Reservoir and past Dickinson.

It is joined by the Green River at Gladstone, and turns east-southeastward into Grant County, passing through Lake Tschida, which is formed by the Heart Butte Dam. Below this dam, the river turns northeastward into Morton County, where it joins the Missouri River at Mandan.

See also

 List of rivers of North Dakota

References

External links

 
 

Rivers of North Dakota
Tributaries of the Missouri River
Rivers of Billings County, North Dakota
Rivers of Grant County, North Dakota
Rivers of Morton County, North Dakota
Rivers of Stark County, North Dakota